Biodiversity of the United Kingdom may refer to:
Fauna of Great Britain
Flora of Great Britain
Biodiversity of British Overseas Territories